= Ning Haoxu =

Chinese association football player

Personal information
- Date of birth: 8 January 2001 (age 25)
- Position: Forward

Team information
- Current team: Guangzhou
- Number: 62

Youth career
- –2021: Guangzhou

Senior career*
Years	Team	Apps	(Gls)
2021–	Guangzhou	0	(0)
- * Club domestic league appearances and goals as of 14:01, 25 June 2021 (UTC)

Ning Haoxu (Chinese: 宁浩旭; born 8 January 2001) is a Chinese footballer currently playing as a forward for Guangzhou.

== Career statistics ==
=== Club ===
As of 25 June 2021.

Club	Season	League			Cup		Continental		Other		Total	
Club	Season	Division	Apps	Goals	Apps	Goals	Apps	Goals	Apps	Goals	Apps	Goals
Guangzhou	2021	Chinese Super League	0	0	0	0	1 (Note: Appearances in the AFC Champions League)	0	0	0	1	0
Career total			0	0	0	0	0	0	0	0	1	0
